The Lord of the Rings: The Card Game is a non-collectible customizable card game produced by Fantasy Flight Games. As part of the Living Card Game (LCG) genre, it is a cooperative and strategic card game set in Middle-earth, a fantasy world featured in literary works by J. R. R. Tolkien, including The Hobbit and The Lord of the Rings. Its digital adaptation, titled The Lord of the Rings: Adventure Card Game, is published by Asmodee Digital for cross-platform play on Microsoft Windows, macOS, PlayStation 4, Xbox One and Nintendo Switch, being the "first ever digital LCG".

Mechanics
Like other card games in Fantasy Flight's "Living Card Game" line, it has deck construction and regularly released expansions similar to a collectible card game, but without the randomized card distribution.

The game may be played either solitaire or with a group. Up to 2 players can play the game with a single core set, and up to 4 players can play with an additional core set. Unlike most card games of this type, this game is a cooperative game; the players are not opponents, but work together against an "encounter deck" which represents the forces of Sauron and produces the obstacles that the players have to conquer.

Each player has their own cards: their heroes (up to 3) which start in play, and a deck of at least 50 cards, composed of Allies, Attachments (such as weapons, armor, and other items), and Events. Although the core set comes with pre-constructed decks, deck construction is a major aspect of the game, and many players build their own decks, utilising cards from the various expansions.

Community
The Lord of the Rings Living Card Game has an active following, with multiple podcasts and blogs dedicated to discussing gameplay, strategy, deck-building, and news, as well as providing custom content. Podcasts include Cardboard of the Rings, The Grey Company, and The Mouth of Sauron. Blogs include Tales From the Cards, Hall of Beorn, Master of Lore, Dor Cuarthol, and Vision of the Palantir.

Expansions
There are several types of expansion to this game. Each Deluxe Expansion (and the core set) contain 3 quests and begins a new cycle, which usually shares a mechanical or story-driven theme. These releases are supplemented by 6 Adventure Packs for a total of 9 quests per cycle. The Hero and Campaign Expansions combine a cycle's Deluxe Expansion and its related Adventure packs (i.e. The Lost Realm expansion and the six Angmar Awakened packs) into two products, while also adding campaign cards. The Saga Expansions follow the story of The Hobbit and The Lord of the Rings, with the initial time-frame for the game the 17 years between Bilbo leaving The Shire and Frodo following him. The latter introduced a mode of play called Campaign mode allowing for some degree of permanence between the quests telling the story. Players can earn powerful "Boon" cards, which can be used in the following quests, as well as "Burden" cards which make future quests more difficult.

The Standalone Scenarios are one-off quests released without any playing cards. Fantasy Flight Games usually releases one to coincide with their Gen Con event and their Fellowship (in the house) event. They have often been more difficult than a standard quest and allow the designers to experiment with ideas outside the confines of the main game.

Adventure Pack Cycles continue the story of Deluxe Expansions, or, in the case of the Shadows of Mirkwood Cycle, the Base Game. Each Deluxe expansion provides encounter cards for three scenarios, and each Adventure Pack in the associated Cycle provides encounter cards for one more scenario. Both types of expansions also introduce new player cards. An Adventure pack consists of 60 fixed cards.

Adventure Card Game
In October 2017, Asmodee Digital and Fantasy Flight announced the formation of Fantasy Flight Interactive, a division of the merged companies to bring more of Fantasy Flight's physical board games to digital implementations. Among the games, developed by the studio was The Lord of the Rings: Adventure Card Game. Fantasy Flight Interactive released it on 28 August 2018 with the title The Lord of the Rings Living Card Game in an early access phase. It was fully released on 29 August 2019 on PC and Mac (Steam), and by the end of the year on PlayStation 4, Xbox One, and Nintendo Switch (developed by Virtuos) with cross-platform play. In December 2019 (Steam) and early 2020 (other platforms) it was upgraded under the title The Lord of the Rings: Adventure Card Game - Definitive Edition which includes all additional content as well as a new mode. However, as part of company-wide layoffs, the Fantasy Flight Interactive division was closed down in January 2020. Following the closure of Fantasy Flight Interactive, by February 2020, Asmodee announced that it was opening up its library of board games to be made into digital versions through licensing options to any developer. Since mid-2020, the game's developing was continued by Antihero Studios, who made a major update in October 2020 introducing offline play mode and new Adventure mode with free pack "The Fords of Isen" among others.

The game is not a direct adaptation but heavily inspired by the original card game. It has campaign stories, adventures, and quests that are narrated and with different paths, characters who are voiced, and dynamic reactions by the artificial intelligence of Sauron (and Saruman) in three difficulty levels (standard, advanced, and expert). It is based on player versus environment experience (PvE) intended for a solo player and online co-op. Decks are composed of 3 heroes and 30 common cards out of many heroes and different card types (allies, attachments, and events), with all the cards divided into four categories (purple "leadership", green "lore", blue "spirit", and red "tactics"), which the player can combine in deck building making various decks besides the pre-built decks with different styles of play. The cards have a cost value to play, with characters having an attack, health, and willpower number, with the latter used for completing objectives or raising the player's meter to activate bonus abilities. Sauron also has his own cards and "threat" meter which uses to activate bonus events and when full makes an automatic defeat of the player. Each round, the player and the enemy take turns playing a single action until all playable options are exhausted.

Reception
Both versions were released to positive reception. The 2018 Zatu Games review gave a score of 85 out of 100 to the tabletop version, praising the quality of the thematic content, artwork, game structure, challenges that are replayable by different approaches, and player interaction, making it especially attractive to those wanting to explore the world of Middle-earth. However both with review by HCL, noted it's needed to keep in mind it has a demanding learning curve to successfully beat the game and the number of expansions. It received several nominations at the Golden Geek Awards for the best card game, thematic board game, board game artwork/presentation, and 2-player board game category.

The digital version on review aggregator website Metacritic has a score of 70-75 out of 100 based on few reviews published before the release of the definitive edition in December 2019. Although still not as expansive in content as the tabletop version, they praised that the game is bringing a new PvE and cooperative gameplay to the digital collectible card game industry, the art, story-telling, voice acting, and game mechanic which cards are a bit simplified in comparison to tabletop due to the format, having resemblance to Hearthstone, but none the less complexity and strategy to tabletop. Chris Carter writing for Destructoid found it "one of the most enjoyable games I've ever experienced, tabletop or otherwise" and concluded that the way Living Card Game (LCG) genre is created and developed through the game "could be a guiding light in an increasingly predatory industry. With loot box legislation around the corner ... it may launch at a perfect time".

See also
Middle-earth Collectible Card Game (out-of-print)
The Lord of the Rings Trading Card Game (out-of-print)

References

External links
The Card Game Official Website
Adventure Card Game Official Website

Card games introduced in 2011
2018 video games
Collectible card games
Cooperative video games
Digital collectible card games
Dedicated deck card games
Fantasy games
Fantasy Flight Games games
Games based on Middle-earth
MacOS games
Nintendo Switch games
PlayStation 4 games
Single-player video games
Video games with cross-platform play
Windows games
Xbox One games